Dongdaemun District ("Great Eastern Gate") is one of the 25 districts of Seoul, South Korea.

Dongdaemun has a population of 346,770 (2010) and has a geographic area of 14.22 km2 (5.49 sq mi), and is divided into 14 dong (administrative neighborhoods). Dongdaemun is located in northeastern Seoul, bordering the city districts of Seongbuk to the northwest, Jongno to the west, Seongdong to the south, Gwangjin to the southeast, and Jungnang to the east.

Dongdaemun is part of the Seongjeosimni (Outer old Seoul) area and is named after Heunginjimun, one of the Eight Gates of Seoul which is not located within the district. Dongdaemun is home to the University of Seoul, Cheongnyangni station, and to Gyeongdong Market, one of the largest herbal medicine and agricultural markets in South Korea.

Yoo Deok-yeol (유덕열) of the Democratic Party has been the mayor of Dongdaemun since July 2010.

History
Dongdaemun District was first created in 1943 when the "gu" system started and was larger in area than it is today. Seongbuk District separated from the district in 1949, and Changsin Dong and Sungin Dong were given to Jongno District in 1975. An additional 17 dong (neighborhoods) separated to become Jungnang District in 1988.

Administrative divisions

Dongdaemun District currently comprises 14 dongs.
Cheongnyangni-dong
Dapsimni 1-dong
Dapsimni 2-dong
Hoegi-dong
Hwigyeong 1-dong
Hwigyeong 2-dong
Imun 1-dong
Imun 2-dong
Jangan 1-dong
Jangan 2-dong
Jegi-dong
Jeonnong 1-dong
Jeonnong 2-dong
Yongsin-dong

Transportation

Underground
Korail(Korean Railway) and Seoul Metro
Underground Line 1
(Jongno-gu) ← Sinseol-dong — Jegi-dong — Cheongnyangni — Hoegi — Hankuk University of Foreign Studies — Sinimun → (Seongbuk-gu)
Seoul Metro
Underground Line 2
 (Seongdong-gu) → Yongdu − Sinseol-dong 
Seoul Metropolitan Rapid Transit Corporation
Underground Line 5
(Seongdong-gu) ← Dapsimni — Janghanpyeong → (Gwangjin-gu)
Korail(Korean Railway)
Jungang Section Line from Yongsan to Paldang
(Seongdong-gu) ← Cheongnyangni (aboveground) — Hoegi → (Jungnang-gu)
There are more stations will add.

Geography
Dongdaemun District borders Seongbuk District to the north-west, Jungnang District to the east (with the Jungnangcheon stream forming the border), Gwangjin District to the south-east, Seongdong District to the south, meets Jung District at a point in the south-west and borders Jongno District to the west.  The busiest neighbourhood of the district is the Cheongnyangni area - a large commercial zone formed around Cheongnyangni Station, one of the secondary CBDs of Seoul.  Dongdaemun District is named after the east gate in Seoul's city walls, Dongdaemun, but Dongdaemun itself is actually located in Jongno District. This is due to an administrative border change.

Education

Universities
 University of Seoul
 Kyunghee University
 Hankuk University of Foreign Studies

Research
 Korea Institute for Advanced Study

Attractions
 Gyeongdong Market
 Dongseo Market
 King Sejong Memorial
 Seoul City Cultural Asset: Seonnongdan (선농단 先農壇), King Sejong Sindobi (세종대왕신도비 世宗大王神道碑, monumental stone)
 National Treasure:  Supyo (수표 水標)
 Historical Site: Yeonghuiwon (영휘원永徽園)
The grave sites of Kim Byeongro (김병로 金炳魯), Han Yongwoon (한용운 韓龍雲), Ahn Changho and Oh Sechang (오세창 吳世昌) are also located in this district.

Sister cities
 Anguo, China
 Yanqing, China
 Shanghai, China
 New York City, United States
 Los Angeles, United States
 Paris, France
 Lyon, France
 London, England

References

External links

 Official site 

 
Districts of Seoul